Flagstaff, known in Māori as Te Whanaupaki,  is a prominent hill overlooking the northwest of the city of Dunedin, in New Zealand's South Island. Together with Mount Cargill, which lies to its northeast, it dominates the skyline of the city. Flagstaff lies seven kilometres to the north of Dunedin's city centre.

The hill was known by the Māori as Whakari, and an anglicised form of this name is still used for the Dunedin suburb of Wakari, which lies to the south of Flagstaff. The city's first road route to the Taieri Plains, which lie to the west, skirted the slopes of Flagstaff, and is still used as an alternative route out of the city.

The Pineapple Track, part of Dunedin's Skyline Walkway, crosses the peak of Flagstaff. The track's unusual name dates from the 1920s, when a local grocer used to act as a guide to the top of Flagstaff, handing out tins of pineapple as a refreshment at the top. The empty cans were often left behind, and were frequently seen along the side of the track as unofficial marker posts. This track, though not an arduous walk, needs to be treated with care, as the weather around Flagstaff can be extremely unpredictable.

References

 Bishop, G. and Hamel, A. (1993). From Sea to Silver Peaks. Dunedin : McIndoe Publishers.
 Dann, C. and Peat, N. (1989). Dunedin, North and South Otago. Wellington: GP Books.

Geography of Dunedin
Hills of Otago